Plaster City is an unincorporated community in Imperial County in the U.S. state of California.

United States Gypsum operates a large gypsum quarry and plant there and owns the town. The quarry was started in 1920 and was acquired by United States Gypsum in 1945. Plaster City was the southern terminus of the last industrial narrow gauge railroad in the United States. The  gauge line ran from another quarry about  miles to the northwest, bringing gypsum to the plant.

The first post office at Plaster City opened in 1924.

The ZIP Code is 92251. The community is inside area code 760.

Plaster City is surrounded by two Off-Highway Vehicle Areas operated by the Bureau of Land Management: Plaster City West Off-Highway Vehicle Area and Plaster City East Off-Highway Vehicle Area.

Government

Publicity and Media
In the 1963 film It's a Mad, Mad, Mad, Mad World, Ethel Merman's character is seen talking on a pay telephone to her son, saying that she was "in a place called Plaster City."

Plaster City was briefly, in 1993, the locale of the fully restored Eureka Locomotive, one of the last narrow gauge steam locomotives from the height of railroad development in the West.

References

Unincorporated communities in Imperial County, California
Company towns in California
Populated places in the Colorado Desert
Populated places established in 1924
1924 establishments in California
Unincorporated communities in California